This is a list of notable people from Silesia.

Nobel laureates 
Theodor Mommsen (1902, literature)
Philipp Lenard (1905, physics)
Eduard Buchner (1907, chemistry)
Paul Ehrlich (1908, medicine)
Gerhart Hauptmann (1912, literature)
Fritz Haber (1918, chemistry)
Friedrich Bergius (1931, chemistry)
Carl von Ossietzky (1935, peace)
Gerhard Domagk (1939, medicine)
Otto Stern (1943, physics)
Kurt Alder (1950, chemistry)
Max Born (1954, physics)
Maria Goeppert-Mayer (1963, physics)
Konrad Bloch (1964, medicine)
Johannes Georg Bednorz (1987, physics)
Hans Georg Dehmelt (1989, physics)
Reinhard Selten (1994, economics)
Günter Blobel (1999, medicine)
Olga Tokarczuk (2018, literature)

Alphabetical order

A 
Erich Abraham, officer
Andreas Acoluthus, theologian and orientalist
Melchior Adam, literary historian
bishop Stanisław Adamski
Joy Adamson (born Friederike Victoria Gessner), naturalist and writer
Eufemia von Adlersfeld-Ballestrem, novelist
Kurt Alder, chemist
Henryk Alszer, soccer player
Johann Baptist Alzog, theologian and historian
Zygmunt Anczok, soccer player
Adolf Anderssen, chess grandmaster
Georg Graf von Arco, physicist, radio pioneer
Hans-Jürgen von Arnim, general
Iris von Arnim, fashion designer
Hans Erasmus Aßmann, statesman and poet
Andreas von Aulock, colonel
, general
Walter Arndt, zoologist and physician

B 
Paul Baender, politician and chess player
Adolf Aron Baginsky, pediatrician
John Baildon, Scottish pioneer in metallurgy in Silesia
Michael Ballack, soccer player
the House of Ballestrem, de, pl
Hans Baluschek, painter
Jan Banaś, soccer player
Franz Bardon, occultist
Walter Bathe, swimmer
bishop Herbert Bednorz
Johannes Georg Bednorz, physicist
Hans Bellmer, painter and sculptor
Benedict of Poland, explorer
Henryk Bereska; pl, de, translator and poet
Max Berg, architect
Friedrich Bergius, chemist
Saul Berlin, scholar
Gottfried Bermann, publisher
cardinal Adolf Bertram
Petr Bezruč, poet
von Bibran-Modlau family
Albert Bielschowsky, literary historian
Max Bielschowsky, neuropathologist
Horst Bienek, writer
Stanisław Bieniasz, writer; pl
Elżbieta Bieńkowska, politician, deputy prime minister of Poland
Iva Bittová, violinist, singer, and composer
rev. Franciszek Blachnicki
William Blandowski, zoologist and mining engineer
Leszek Blanik, gymnast
Barbara Blida, politician
Konrad Emil Bloch, biochemist
Josef Block, painter
Günter Blobel, biologist
Fannie Bloomfield Zeisler, pianist
Maurice Bloomfield, philologist
Friedrich Blühmel; de
Krystyna Bochenek, politician
Hermann Boehm, admiral
Sebastian Boenisch, soccer player
Bishop  
Lothar Bolz, politician
Dietrich Bonhoeffer, theologian
Karl Bonhoeffer, psychiatrist
Karl Friedrich Bonhoeffer, chemist
Klaus Bonhoeffer, lawyer
Ernst Borinski, sociologist
Max Born, physicist
Willibald Borowietz, general
Arka Bożek, Silesian politician; pl
Josef Božek, engineer and inventor
Ernst-Joachim Bradel, colonel
Walter Brom, soccer player
Lucjan Brychczy, soccer player
Ignatz Bubis, politician
Andrzej Buncol, soccer player
Agata Buzek, actress
Jan Buzek, physician and politician
Jerzy Buzek, engineer and politician, prime minister of Poland
Józef Buzek, economist and politician
Jan Bystroń, linguist
Jan Stanisław Bystroń, sociologist

C 
Ernst Cassirer, philosopher
Ewald Cebula, soccer player
Blessed Ceslaus; (bł. Czesław Odrowąż), Dominican friar
Dietrich von Choltitz, general
Jerzy Chromik, long-distance runner
rev. Jan Piotr Chrząszcz; pl, de, historian 
Claudia Ciesla, female model
Gerard Cieślik, soccer player
Ferdinand Cohn (1828–1898), biologist
Maria Cunitia (Cunitz) (1610–1664), astronomer
Richard Courant, mathematician
Johannes Crato von Krafftheim (1519–1585), imperial physician
bishop Andrzej Czaja; pl
Herbert Czaja, politician
Richard Czaya; de, chess master

D 
Kurt Daluege, SS-general, Deputy Protector of Bohemia and Moravia
Frank Damrosch, music conductor and educator
Ernst Degner, motorcycle road racer
Hans Georg Dehmelt, physicist, Nobel Prize laureate
Hans Karl Graf von Diebitsch-Sabalkanski (Graf Ivan Ivanovich Dibich-Zabalkansky), Russian field marshal
cardinal Melchior von Diepenbrock, Prince-Bishop of Breslau
Leopold Wilhelm von Dobschütz, general
the House of Henckel von Donnersmarck
Hans-Jürgen Dörner, soccer player and coach
Bernard Drzyzga; pl, colonel
Ireneusz Dudek; pl, blues vocalist
Jerzy Dudek, soccer player
Rafał Dutkiewicz, politician
Ewald Dytko, soccer player
Wojciech Dzieduszycki; pl, count
Johann Dzierzon,  apiarist

E 
Katja Ebstein, singer
Franz Eckert, musician who composed the national anthem of Japan
Paul Ehrlich (1854–1915), physiologist
Joseph Freiherr von Eichendorff, poet
Bernd Eistert, chemist
Norbert Elias (1897–1990), sociologist
Józef Elsner, composer, music teacher and theoretician
Emin Pasha (Isaak Eduard Schnitzer), physician
Leszek Engelking, writer, poet, translator, scholar
Berthold Englisch, chess master
Anzelm Ephorinus; pl, physician
Johann Samuel Ersch, bibliographer

F 
Eugeniusz Faber, soccer player
Nikolaus von Falkenhorst, general
Gottfried Bermann Fischer, publisher
Grzegorz Fitelberg, conductor, violinist and composer
Walenty Fojkis; pl, politician
Jan Foltys, chess master
Emanuel Aloys Förster, composer
Friedrich Heinrich Ferdinand Leopold von Forcade de Biaix (1747–1808), Royal Prussian lieutenant colonel, Knight of the Order of Pour le Mérite
Friedrich Wilhelm Ferdinand Ernst Heinrich von Forcade de Biaix (1787–1835), Royal Prussian major and Knight of the Iron Cross 2nd Class
Friedrich Wilhelm Leopold Konstantin Quirin, Baron von Forcade de Biaix (1784–1840), Royal Prussian major, Knight of the Iron Cross, Knight of the Order of St. John Bailiwick of Brandenburg (1817), Royal Prussian Chamberlain, and Castellan of Neuenrade in the County of Mark
Rudolf Fränkel, architect
Heinz Fraenkel-Conrat, biochemist
Egon Franke, fencer
Zecharias Frankel, historian
Gustav Freytag, writer
Fritz von Friedlaender-Fuld; de (1858–1917), industrialist
Johnny Friedlaender (1912–1992), painter
Max Friedlaender (1852–1934), musicologist
Carl Friedländer (1847–1887), bacteriologist
Max Friedländer (1829–1872), journalist
Max Jakob Friedländer (1867–1958), art historian
Walter Friedländer (1873–1966), art historian
Anni Friesinger-Postma, speed skater
Willy Fritsch, actor
rev. August Froehlich
Radek Fukala, historian
Jan Furtok, soccer player

G 
Hubert Gad, soccer player
Christian Ganczarski, terrorist
archbishop Józef Gawlina
Dan Gawrecki, historian
Adam Gdacjusz, writer
Adam Abraham von Gaffron und Oberstradam, Danish general
Gunther Gebel-Williams, circus performer, animal trainer
Oscar Gelbfuhs, chess master
Rudolf Christoph Freiherr von Gersdorff, general
Eugeniusz Get-Stankiewicz; pl, sculptor
Edmund Giemsa, soccer player
Georg von Giesche; de, merchant and manufacturer
Karl Gilg, chess master
Krzysztof Globisz, actor
rev. Joseph Glowatzki; de, politician
Karl Godulla, industrialist
Maria Goeppert-Mayer, physicist
Eugen Goldstein, physicist
Kurt Goldstein, neurologist
Robert Gonera, actor
Grzegorz Gerwazy Gorczycki, composer, musician
Jerzy Gorgoń, soccer player
Emil Görlitz; de, soccer player
Jerzy Gorzelik, Silesian politician
Rudolf von Gottschall, poet, dramatist, chess master
Wilhelm Góra, soccer player
Halina Górecka, athlete (sprinter)
Henryk Górecki, composer
Joachim Grallert, watchmaker and jeweler
Heinrich Graetz, historian
Jerzy Grotowski, theatre director
Friedrich Grundmann; pl, businessman, co-founder of Katowice
Ignatz Grünfeld; pl, architect
Andreas Gryphius, poet
Joanna Gryzik von Schomberg-Godula; pl, (Johanna Gräfin von Schaffgotsch); de, industrialist
Karol Grzesik; pl, politician
Bernhard Grzimek, zoologist
cardinal Henryk Gulbinowicz
Torsten Gütschow, soccer player

H 
the House of Habsburg; Branch of Toscania/Teschen
Fritz Haber, chemist
Stanisław Hadyna; pl, composer
Richard Hanke, soccer player
Daniel Harrwitz, chess master
Alfred Hauptmann; de, neurologist
Gerhart Hauptmann, dramatist
Felix Hausdorff, mathematician
Saint Hedwig of Andechs; (św. Jadwiga Śląska), Duchess of Silesia (1174–1243)
Johann Heermann, poet and hymnwriter
Sigfried Held, soccer player and coach
Henry the Bearded, Duke
Henry II the Pious, Duke
Henry III the White, Duke
Henry IV Probus, Duke
Lothar Herbst; pl, poet
Max Herrmann-Neisse; pl, de, writer
Richard Herrmann, soccer player
Arno Herzig; de, historian
Dieter Hildebrandt, kabarettist
Moses Hirschel, writer and chess master
Ludwik Hirszfeld, microbiologist
cardinal August Hlond; Primate of Poland
Hans Heinrich XV von Hochberg, Prince
Karl Höfer, general
Otto Höhne, general
Christian Hoffmann von Hoffmannswaldau, poet and municipal politician
Prince Adolf of Hohenlohe-Ingelfingen, nobleman, soldier, and politician
Prince Kraft of Hohenlohe-Ingelfingen, nobleman and general
August, Prince of Hohenlohe-Öhringen, general, industrialist, landowner and mining business people
Karl Eduard von Holtei; poet and actor
Richard Holtze; szl, politician, co-founder of Katowice
Walther von Holzhausen, chess master
Bernhard von Hülsen, general
Herbert Hupka, politician
Saint Hyacinth; (św. Jacek Odrowąż), Dominican friar, called the Apostle of the North

I 
Salomon Isaac; pl, merchant

J 
Anton Jadasch; de, politician
Lech Janerka, composer
Janosch, children's writer
Michael Jary, composer
Grzegorz Jarzyna; pl, theatre director
Otylia Jędrzejczak, swimmer
Jens Jeremies, soccer player
Moritz Jursitzky, writer

K 
Ryszard Kaczmarek; pl, historian
Zbigniew Kadłubek; pl, classical philologist
Helmut Kajzar; pl, playwright, theatre director
Theodor Kalide, sculptor
David Kalisch, writer and humorist
bishop Maximilian Kaller
Theodor Kaluza, mathematician and physicist
Tomasz Kamusella, linguist
Manfred Kanther, politician
Anna Louisa Karsch, poet
Adolf Kaschny; pl, Silesian politician
Georg Katzer, composer
Lars Kaufmann, handball player
Bernhard Kempa; de, handball player
Alfred Kerr, art critic
Jan Kidawa-Błoński; pl, film director
Leon Kieres, historian
Wojciech Kilar, composer
Gustav Kirchhoff, physicist
Martin Kirschner, surgeon
August Kiss, sculptor
Eckart Klein; de, social scientist
Norbert Klein, Grand Master of the Teutonic Order (1923–1933)
Otto Klemperer, conductor and composer
Karl Ludwig Klose; de, historian
Miroslav Klose, soccer player
Samuel Benjamin Klose; de, historian
Baladine Klossowska, painter
Bernhard Adalbert Emil Koehne, botanist
Alexander Kohut, orientalist
Józef Kokot; pl, soccer player
Heinz Kokott, general
Jan Jakub Kolski, film director and writer
cardinal Bolesław Kominek
Jerzy Konikowski, chess master
Richard Konwiarz; architect
Kopaynski or Kopanski family
cardinal Georg von Kopp
Rudolf Koppitz, photographer
Wojciech Korfanty, politician
Julian Kornhauser, poet and literary critic
Hubert Kostka, soccer player
Jan Kotrč, chess master
Viktor de Kowa, actor and singer
Józef Kożdoń, Silesian autonomist
Marek Krajewski, classical philologist and crime-story writer
Adolf Kramer, chess master
Paul Krause; de (December 27, 1905, † October 19, 1950), politician
Emil Krebs, polyglot and sinologist 
Otto Kretschmer, commodore
Rodolphe Kreutzer (father was born in Silesia), violinist and composer
Henryk Kroll, politician
Jan Kropidło, Duke of Opole, bishop of Chełmno, Kamień Pomorski, Kuyavia, Poznań, archbishop of Gniezno, Primate of Poland
Rafał Kubacki, judo fighter and politician
bishop Teodor Kubina; pl
Richard Kubus, soccer player
Michael Küchmeister von Sternberg, Grand Master of the Teutonic Order (1414–1422)
Wojciech Kuczok, writer
Hans Kudlich, politician and physician
Quirinus Kuhlmann, poet and mystic
Walter Kuhn, historian
Friedrich Wilhelm Kuhnert, painter
Jerzy Kukuczka; alpine and high-altitude climber
Ernst Kunik; sv, historian and archeologist
Theofil Kupka, Silesian politician
Jan Kustos, Silesian politician
Martin Kutta, mathematician
Kazimierz Kutz, film director and politician

L 
Fritz Laband, soccer player
Ferdinand Lassalle, politician
Maciej Łagiewski; pl, historian
Hans Lammers, politician
Georg Landsberg, mathematician
Otto Landsberg de, politician
Benno Landsberger (1890–1968), linguist
Franz Landsberger de, art historian
Julius Landsberger de, orientalist and rabbi
Horst Lange; de, writer
Walter Laqueur, historian
Ewald Latacz, Silesian politician
Waldemar Legień, judoist
Philipp Lenard, physicist
Roman Lentner, soccer player
Jan Liberda, soccer player
the House of Lichnowsky
Felix Graf von Lichnowsky, politician
the House of Liechtenstein
Felix Liebrecht, folklorist
Paul Löbe, politician
Friedrich von Logau, epigrammatist
Daniel Casper von Lohenstein, diplomat and writer
Stanisław Ligoń; pl, writer and painter
Józef Lompa; pl, poet
rev. Józef Londzin; pl, politician
Fritz London, physicist
Ortwin Lowack; de, lawyer and politician
Fred Lowen, designer
Erich Löwenhardt, fighter pilot, Oberleutnant
Arthur Löwenstamm, rabbi
Heinz A. Lowenstam, paleoecologist
Włodzimierz Lubański, soccer player
Emil Ludwig, writer
Hans Lukaschek; de, Silesian politician
Bobby E. Lüthge; de, screenwriter
Alojzy Lysko, writer and politician
Mariusz Łukasiewicz; pl, businessman
Olgierd Łukaszewicz, actor
Ondra Łysohorsky, poet

M 
Gottlieb Machate, chess master
Wacław Maciejowski, historian
Lech Majewski, film and theatre director
Anton Franz Graf von Magnis; de, colonel
Franz Magnis-Suseno; priest, missionary man and Indonesian public figure.
Leonard Malik; pl, soccer player
Richard Malik, soccer player
Adam Małysz, ski jumper
Andrzej Markowski; pl, linguist
Martin of Opava, historian, archbishop of Gniezno, Primate of Poland
Vojtěch Martínek; cs, writer
Kurt Masur, conductor
Michael Graf von Matuschka, politician
Joachim Marx, soccer player
Zygmunt Maszczyk, soccer player
, admiral
Martin Max, soccer player
Ludwig Meidner, painter
cardinal Joachim Meisner
Friedrich von Mellenthin, general
Erich Mende, German politician of the FDP and CDU
Gregor Mendel, biologist
Adolph Menzel, painter
Wolfgang Menzel, poet
Blessed Maria Merkert
Zbigniew Messner, economist, politician, prime minister of the Polish People's Republic
Mieszko I Tanglefoot, Duke of Upper Silesia
Jan Miodek, linguist
Fr. Leopold Moczygemba, founder of the first Silesian-American parish in Panna Maria, Texas.
Helga Molander, actress
Helmuth James Graf von Moltke, jurist and politician
Theodor Mommsen, historian and writer
Gustaw Morcinek, writer
Oskar Morgenstern, economist
, architect
Moritz Moszkowski, composer, pianist
Czesław Mozil, singer
Paul Mross, chess master
Bogdan Musioł, bobsledder
Joseph Musiol, politician
bishop Jan Muskata

N 
bishop Nanker
, poet
Albert Neisser, physician
Gustav Neumann, chess master
Ernst Niekisch, politician
Jaromír Nohavica, poet and songwriter
archbishop Alfons Nossol; pl
Erwin Nyc, soccer player

O 
Teofil Ociepka; pl, naïve painter
Jan Olbrycht, politician
Reinhold Olesch, linguist
Paul Ondrusch, sculptor
Martin Opitz, poet
Władysław Opolczyk, Duke of Opole
Edmund Osmańczyk, writer
Carl von Ossietzky, publicist
Stanisław Oślizło, soccer player

P 
Franz Pacher, engineer 
Idzi Panic, historian
Helmuth von Pannwitz, general and ataman
Rudolf Pannwitz, writer and philosopher
Eduard Pant, politician
Joseph Partsch, geographer
Ildefons Pauler, Grand Master of the Teutonic Order (1970–1988)
rev. Paul Peikert; pl
Teodor Peterek, soccer player
the House of Piast
Ryszard Piec, soccer player
Wilhelm Piec, soccer player
Antoni Piechniczek, soccer player and coach
Franciszek Pieczka, actor
bishop Tadeusz Pieronek
Jerzy Pilch, writer
David Pindur; cs, pl, historian
Józef Pinior, politician
, vicar
, Silesian politician
Heinz Piontek, poet and writer
, actor
Leonard Piontek, soccer player
Sepp Piontek, soccer player and coach
Richard Pipes, historian
Łukasz Piszczek, soccer player
Bartholomaeus Pitiscus, mathematician and astronomer
Marek Plawgo, athlete
the House of Pless
Lukas Podolski, soccer player
Ernest Pohl, soccer player
Hugo von Pohl, admiral
Ewald Stefan Pollok, historian
Yosef Porat, chess master
Hans Poelzig, architect
Vincenz Priessnitz, hydrotherapist
Alfred Pringsheim, mathematician
Ernst Pringsheim Sr., physicist
Ernst Pringsheim Jr., biochemist and botanist
Nathanael Pringsheim, botanist
, railway magnate
Maximilian von Prittwitz, general
the 
, Silesian politician
, actor

R 
Friedrich Wilhelm von Reden, engineer
Jan Reginek; pl, politician
rev. Tomasz Reginek; pl, politician
Eva Gabriele Reichmann, historian and sociologist
, known as Philo vom Walde, poet
Hanna Reitsch, aviator
, politician
Bolko von Richthofen, archeologist
Ferdinand von Richthofen, traveller, geographer
Hermann von Richthofen, diplomat
Lothar von Richthofen, fighter pilot
Manfred von Richthofen, fighter pilot
Wolfram von Richthofen, fighter pilot, General Field Marshal
Ryszard Riedel, blues/rock vocalist
Fritz Riemann, chess master
Günther Rittau, camera operator and film director
Horst Rittner, chess master
Abraham Robinson, mathematician
Julius Roger, entomologist and folklorist
Ottomar Rosenbach, physician
Philipp Roth, cellist
Walenty Roździeński; pl, industrialist and poet
Tadeusz Różewicz, poet
Johann Christian Ruberg, pioneer in the metallurgy of zinc
Hans-Ulrich Rudel, fighter pilot, colonel
Andrzej Rudy, soccer player
Otto Rüster, chess master
Wanda Rutkiewicz, mountain climber
Józef Rymer, politician

S 
Julius von Sachs, botanist
Otto Sackur, chemist
Valery Salov, chess grandmaster
Saint John Sarkander, priest
the House of Schaffgotsch
Hans Ulrich von Schaffgotsch, general
Hans Ulrich von Schaffgotsch: de, industrialist  
Raphael Schäfer, soccer player
Reinhard Schaletzki, soccer player
Robert Schälzky, Grand Master of the Teutonic Order (1936–1948)
cardinal Leo Scheffczyk, theologian
Theodor von Scheve, chess master
bishop Emanuel von Schimonsky; de
Friedrich Schleiermacher
Ludwig Schmitt, chess master
August Schneider; de, politician
August Scholtis; de, pl, writer
Arnold Schottländer, chess master
Heinrich Schulz-Beuthen, composer
Peter Schumann, artist, puppeteer, theatre director
Johann Gottlieb Schummel; de, writer
Theodor Emil Schummel, entomologist
Caspar Schwenckfeld, theologian and writer
Hanna Schygulla, actress
Karl Sczodrok; pl, writer
bishop Leopold von Sedlnitzky
Josef von Sedlnitzky; de
Paul Segieth; de, painter
Oskar Seidlin, writer
Reinhard Selten, economist
Gustavus Sidenberg, financier
Janusz Sidło, athlete
Tomasz Sikora, biathlete
Angelus Silesius, poet
Edward Simoni; de, pan flute musician
Gerhard Skrobek, sculptor
archbishop Wiktor Skworc; pl
Aleksandra Śląska, actress
Henryk Sławik, diplomat
Bohdan Smoleń, comedian
Michał Smolorz; pl, publicist
Franciszek Smuda, soccer player and coach
Monika Soćko, chess grandmaster
Emanuel Sperner, mathematician
Edith Stein, philosopher, Roman Catholic saint
Hugo Steinhaus, mathematician
Fritz Stern, historian
Otto Stern, physicist
Ernst Steinitz, mathematician
Feliks Steuer, Silesian educationist
Hyacinth Graf Strachwitz von Groß-Zauche und Camminetz, general
Moritz von Strachwitz, writer
Pavle Jurišić Šturm, Serbian general
Czesław Suszczyk, soccer player
Carl Gottlieb Svarez, jurist
Dariusz Świercz, chess grandmaster
Waldemar Świerzy, poster artist
rev. Józef Szafranek; pl, politician
Karina Szczepkowska-Horowska, chess grandmaster
Thomas Szczeponik, Silesian politician
rev. Leopold Szersznik (Leopold Jan Šeršník); pl, bibliophile
Sławomir Szmal, handball player
Józef Szmidt, athlete
Zygfryd Szołtysik, soccer player
rev. Emil Szramek; pl (born Emil Michael Schramek)
Edward Szymkowiak, soccer player

T 
Siegbert Tarrasch, chess grandmaster
Max Tau, writer
Adam Taubitz, musician
Johannes Thiele, chemist
Wolfgang Thierse, politician
Georg Thomalla, actor
Harry Thürk, writer
prince-bishop Johannes V. Thurzo; de
Olga Tokarczuk, writer
Henryk Tomaszewski, mime
Klaus Töpfer, politician
Alfons Tracki, priest
Ludwig Traube, physician
Moritz Traube, biochemist
Wilhelm Traube, chemist
Oscar Troplowitz, pharmacist, inventor of Nivea
rev. Jiří Třanovský, pastor and hymnwriter, the "Luther of the Slavs"
Paul Tschackert, theologian and historian
Szczepan Twardoch; pl, writer
Sebastian Tyrała, soccer player

U 
Tomáš Ujfaluši, soccer player
Alexander Ulfig; de, philosopher and sociologist
Arnold Ulitz; de, writer
rev. Carl Ulitzka; de, Silesian politician
Kurt Urbanek; de, politician
Zacharias Ursinus, theologian and author of the Heidelberg Catechism

V 
Julius von Verdy du Vernois, general and military writer
Hieronymus Vietor, printer and publisher
Ingmar Villqist; sv, writer

W 
Andrzej Waligórski; pl, actor and poet
Henryk Waniek; pl, painter and writer
Walter Warzecha, admiral
Krzysztof Warzycha, soccer player
Franz Waxman, composer
Martin Websky; de, mineralogist
Karl Weigert, pathologist
Erich Weinitschke, chess master
Edmund Weiss, astronomer
Friedrich Weißler, lawyer
rev. Augustin Weltzel; pl, historian
Henry Wenceslaus, Duke of Oels-Bernstadt, Governor of Silesia (1629–1639)
Carl Wernicke, neurologist
archbishop Stefan Wesoły; pl
Robert Więckiewicz, actor
Ernest Wilimowski, soccer player
Wincenty of Kielcza, poet
Franz von Winckler; de, industrialist
Johann Heinrich Winckler, physicist and philosopher
Hubert von Tiele-Winckler; de, industrialist
Eva von Tiele-Winckler; de, diakonissa
Walter Winkler, soccer player
Witelo ca.1230-ca.1300, physicist
Paul Wittich, mathematician and astronomer
Erwin von Witzleben, field marshal
Peter Wlast, palatine
Gerard Wodarz, soccer player
Erich Peter Wohlfarth, physicist
Józef Wojaczek, priest, member of the Mariannhill Missionaries.
Rafał Wojaczek, poet
Balduin Wolff, drawer and painter
Konstanty Wolny; pl, politician
Johann Gottlob Worbs; de, historian
Jerzy Wostal, soccer player
Dariusz Wosz, soccer player
Remus von Woyrsch, general
Tomasz Wylenzek, canoer
Klaus Wyrtki, geophysicist

Y 
Peter Graf Yorck von Wartenburg, jurist and politician

Z 
Rudolf Žáček; cs, historian
Adam Zagajewski, poet
Vilém Závada; cs, poet
Jolanta Zawadzka, chess grandmaster
Karl Abraham von Zedlitz, politician
Hans Zenker, admiral
Alfons Zgrzebniok; pl, military officer and politician
Jerzy Ziętek, politician
Krystian Zimerman, pianist
archbishop Damian Zimoń
Benedict Zuckermann, scientist
Arnold Zweig, writer
Stefanie Zweig, writer

The major Silesian cities 

Bielsko-Biała
Bohumín
Brzeg
Bruntál
Bytom
Cieszyn
Chorzów
Frýdek-Místek
Gliwice
Głogów
Görlitz
Hoyerswerda
Jelenia Góra
Jeseník
Katowice
Karviná
Kłodzko
Kluczbork
Krnov

Legnica
Lubin
Oleśnica
Opava
Opole
Ostrava
Mysłowice
Nysa
Prudnik
Pszczyna
Racibórz
Ruda Śląska
Rybnik
Tarnowskie Góry
Tychy
Wałbrzych
Wrocław
Zabrze
Zielona Góra
Żagań

Literature 
 Norman Davies and Roger Moorhouse: Microcosm: Portrait of a Central European City, London: Jonathan Cape, 2002. 
 Marek Czapliński, Elżbieta Kaszuba, Gabriela Wąs, Rościsław Żerelik: Historia Śląska, Wydawnictwo Uniwersytetu Wrocławskiego, 2002. 
 Hugo Weczerka: Handbuch der historischen Stätten: Schlesien. Stuttgart: Alfred Kröner Verlag, 2003. .
 Historia Górnego Śląska, ed. Joachim Bahlcke, Dan Gawrecki, Ryszard Kaczmarek, Dom Współpracy Polsko-Niemieckiej, Gliwice 2011. .
 Arno Herzig, Krzysztof Ruchniewicz, Małgorzata Ruchniewicz: Śląsk i jego dzieje, Wydawnictwo Via Nova, Wrocław 2012.

See also 
List of Poles
List of Germans
List of Czechs
List of Austrians

Silesians
 
Silesians